Gidamis Shahanga (born September 4, 1957 in Katesh, Hanang District in Manyara Region), is a retired Tanzanian long-distance runner who specialized in the 10,000 metres and the marathon race. His personal best at the marathon was 2:08:32 at the 1990 Berlin Marathon.

Achievements

External links

1957 births
Living people
Tanzanian male long-distance runners
Tanzanian male marathon runners
Athletes (track and field) at the 1978 Commonwealth Games
Athletes (track and field) at the 1982 Commonwealth Games
Athletes (track and field) at the 1980 Summer Olympics
Athletes (track and field) at the 1984 Summer Olympics
Olympic athletes of Tanzania
Commonwealth Games gold medallists for Tanzania
Commonwealth Games medallists in athletics
World Athletics Championships athletes for Tanzania
University of Texas at El Paso alumni
UTEP Miners men's track and field athletes
Medallists at the 1978 Commonwealth Games
Medallists at the 1982 Commonwealth Games